Marsha's lanternshark (Etmopterus marshae) is a species of shark in the family Etmopteridae. It is found in the Western Pacific near the Philippines and can reach 23.4 cm in length.

Description 
Males reach a length of up to 23.4 cm, while females reach 19.2 cm. The species is slender and has a whitish and purplish body colouration. Between the pectoral and pelvic fins and the upper caudal fins are markings with a dark and light banding pattern.

Distribution and habitat 
The species occurs in a small area between Taiwan and the Philippines, near the Batanes. It inhabits marine waters from 322 to 337 meters deep over a sandy bottom.

References 

Fish described in 2018
Etmopterus